Neculai Vasilca (born 28 November 1955) is a retired Romanian handball pivot. He played 126 matches for the national team and scored 261 goals, winning bronze medals at the 1980 and 1984 Olympics. After retiring from competitions, he became a coach, managing, among others, GSV Eintracht Baunatal in Germany.

References

1955 births
Living people
Sportspeople from Bacău
Romanian male handball players
Handball players at the 1980 Summer Olympics
Handball players at the 1984 Summer Olympics
Olympic handball players of Romania
Olympic bronze medalists for Romania
Olympic medalists in handball
Medalists at the 1984 Summer Olympics
Medalists at the 1980 Summer Olympics